Malcolm Francis Aylesworth Lindsay (February 4, 1909 – May 3, 1983) was the 14th Commissioner of the Royal Canadian Mounted Police, serving from August 15, 1967 to September 30, 1969.

He served as Mountie from 1934 to 1969.

Honoured Received
 RCMP Long Service Medal
 The Canadian Centennial Medal
 Queen Elizabeth II Coronation Medal

References

 

1909 births
1983 deaths
Royal Canadian Mounted Police commissioners
Civil awards and decorations of Canada